This is the discography for Hello! Project.

Albums

Studio albums

Compilation albums

Drama CD albums

Singles

As lead artist

As featured artist

References

Discographies of Japanese artists
Pop music discographies